Miracle Igbokwe (born February 17, 1995) is a Nigerian pilot and model from Imo State. He won the season 3 of the Big Brother Naija reality TV show which was broadcast on 28 January and ended on 22 April 2018. On 30 May 2018, Miracle received his N25 million cheque, a Hyundai SUV, and a trip to an exotic location for two people.

Early life and career
Miracle is from Imo State, Nigeria. Miracle entered the Big Brother Naija house on 28 January 2018. He was announced as the winner on 22 April 2018.

On 30 April 2018, He was appointed by the Imo State governor Rochas Okorocha as the ambassador of education. On 26 June 2019, he graduated from an aviation school in the United States.

References

External links
Miracle on Instagram

Living people
1995 births
Big Brother (franchise) winners
People from Imo State
Nigerian male models
Participants in Nigerian reality television series